AZB & Partners is a corporate law firm in India, with offices spread across Mumbai, Delhi NCR, Bangalore and Pune. The firm comprises over 90 partners specialising in General Corporate, M&A and Banking and Finance practice and other specialised verticals such as Dispute Resolution, Real Estate,  Competition Law, Intellectual Property, Capital Markets, Compliance & Investigations, Funds, Employment Law etc. AZB & Partners' domestic and international clients range from privately owned to publicly listed companies, including Fortune 500 entities, Multinationals, Investment Banks and Private Equity firms.

History 
Zia Mody, an alumnus of Cambridge University and Harvard Law School who had worked with Baker & McKenzie in New York established her own Litigation practice in Mumbai as the sole proprietor of the Chambers of Zia Mody. She had been friends with Bahram Vakil, a graduate of Columbia University who also practiced for 2 years in the United States before returning to India and working as a partner at Little & Co.. The two chose to partner and established CZB (Chambers of Zia and Bahram). Ajay Bahl started his career as a Chartered Accountant but was persuaded by N.K.P Salve to study law and intern with prominent lawyer Soli Sorabjee (Zia's father), after which Ajay set up his own practice in New Delhi.

AZB & Partners was formed in 2004 when CZB & Partners in Mumbai merged with Ajay Bahl & Company in Delhi. The firm has moved away from the traditional family-style set-up, however, and has a clear partnership track in place, which has led it to be credited for the modernity of its practice. The firm entered into a "best friends agreement" with UK-based Clifford Chance in early 2009, which was terminated by mutual agreement in January 2011.

Locations 
The Firm has a total of 6 offices in India: Two each in Mumbai and Delhi NCR and one each in Bangalore and Pune.

Practice Areas 
The major practice areas of the Firm include:

 Mergers & Acquisitions
 Joint Ventures & General Corporate
 Private Equity & Funds
 Banking & Finance
 Real Estate
 Insurance
 Competition
 Dispute Resolution
 Capital Markets
 Employment
 Compliance & Investigation
 Tax
 Technology, Media & Telecommunication 
 Intellectual Property
 Projects & Energy
Funds
Private Client Practice

Partners 
The firm has more than 100 partners.

Awards 
AZB & Partners has received wide national and international acclaim within the legal sphere, some of which include 'Ranked No.1' by RSG Top 40 India law firm ranking in 2019 and 2017, 'Best Overall Law Firm of the Year- 2017' at India Business Law Journal's Indian Law Firms Awards, 2017–18, 'Law Firm of the Year- 2017' by VC Circle (topping the tables in both deal count and volume) 'Client Service Law Firm of the Year - 2017' by Chambers and Partners Asia-Pacific Awards. For the first quarter of 2018, the firm was ranked on top in both M&A deal count and volume on the league tables published by Merger Market, Bloomberg and Thomson Reuters.

References

Law firms of India
Law firms established in 2004
Legal organisations based in India